Joaquín Jara (Zaragoza, c. 1676 - Toledo, 1747 or 1756) was a Spanish composer.

In 1715, when he was organist of Valencia Cathedral, Martínez initiated the five-year-long pamphlet war against Francisco Valls for the unconventional dissonances in the Miserere of Valls' Missa Scala Arentina.

Works
 Los Desgravios de Troya (1712), composed for the birth of the crown prince, Don Philip, Infante of Spain, born at Madrid, June 7, 1712. The 1712 publication of the score was the first example of the publication of Spanish theatre music.

Discography
 selections from Los Desgravios de Troya (1712) on Canciones de amor y de guerra, Maria Luz Alvarez, Clarincanto, Pneuma 390, 2002.

References

1670s births
18th-century deaths
Year of birth uncertain
Year of death uncertain
Spanish Baroque composers
Spanish male classical composers
18th-century classical composers
18th-century male musicians